Albert Simon (3 July 1901 – 13 March 1956) was a Luxembourgian painter. His work was part of the painting event in the art competition at the 1924 Summer Olympics.

References

1901 births
1956 deaths
20th-century Luxembourgian painters
20th-century male artists
Olympic competitors in art competitions
People from Sanem
Male painters